Daleyville (also Dailyville, Dalyville) is an unincorporated community in Pike County, Ohio, United States.

Notes

Unincorporated communities in Pike County, Ohio
Unincorporated communities in Ohio